Twins is a young adult novel written by Marcy Dermansky. It was originally published on October 17th, 2006, by William Morrow and Company. It is written in the first person, but the narration alternates between two twin sisters, Sue and Chloe. The events described begin on the eve of the twins' thirteenth birthday, when they agree to get matching tattoos to prove their bond is stronger than DNA.

Footnotes

2006 novels
Novels set in the United States
Twins in fiction